Yang Chengzong (1911–2011) was a radiochemist, academician, and professor at the University of Science and Technology of China. He is regarded as the founding father of Radiochemistry in China.

He contributed to the establishment of the university in 1958 and founded the university's Department of Radiochemistry and Radiation Chemistry.

He established the first radiochemistry laboratory in China. In November 1978, Yang was appointed as the Vice President of the University of Science and Technology of China, and he retired from the university in March 1994.China. He is a member of the Chinese Chemical Society and the Chinese Nuclear Society. He served as the chair of the Professional Committee of Nuclear and Radiochemistry of the organizations.

Education and career

Yang was born in Wujiang District, Suzhou in 1911. He obtained a degree from Utopia University. He began his career in radiochemistry at the Radium Institute. He attended the Curie Institute in 1947. He obtained a doctorate degree in 1951 from the College of Science, Paris-Sud University. His first engagement with radiochemistry research was at the China Institute of Atomic Energy.

Yang contributed to the field of nuclear fuel production, which impacted nuclear weapons tests and the development of China's nuclear energy.

References

1911 births
Chinese people
2011 deaths